Liang Yongfeng (born 27 June 1997) is a Chinese footballer who currently plays for Hong Kong Premier League club R&F on loan from Guangzhou R&F.

Club career
Liang Yongfeng was promoted to Chinese Super League side Guangzhou R&F's first team squad by manager Dragan Stojković in 2017. In August 2017, he was loaned to Guangzhou R&F's satellite team R&F (Hong Kong) in the Hong Kong Premier League. On 9 September 2017, he made his senior debut in a 3–2 away loss to Hong Kong Pegasus.

Career statistics 
.

References

External links
 

1997 births
Living people
Association football defenders
Chinese footballers
Footballers from Foshan
Guangzhou City F.C. players
R&F (Hong Kong) players
Chinese Super League players
Hong Kong Premier League players